Goose Creek is a stream in northern Wayne and southern Iron counties in the U.S. state of Missouri. It is a tributary of Big Creek.

The stream flows southwest then northwest passing through the Chain of Lakes and into Iron County.

Goose Creek most likely was so named on account of wild geese in the area.

See also
List of rivers of Missouri

References

Rivers of Iron County, Missouri
Rivers of Wayne County, Missouri
Rivers of Missouri